Shirley June "Sheree" Winton (née Patrick; 4 November 1935 – 29 May 1976) was an English actress, and the mother of television presenter Dale Winton.

Early life
Winton was born on 4 November 1935 in Sheffield, England.

Career
Winton was often referred to as "the English Jayne Mansfield" and appeared in many films and television shows throughout her career. Her film appearances included The Devil's Disciple (1959), Dentist in the Chair (1960), The Road to Hong Kong (1962) and Rhubarb (1969). She was also known for her TV show appearances with Frankie Howerd and Terry-Thomas.

She was chosen Queen for a Day by the Oldham Charity Carnival in 1957. Among her film and TV appearances, she played herself in the series That Was the Week That Was (1962–1963) and Kindly Leave the Stage (1968). She had an uncredited bit part in the James Bond film Thunderball (1965).

Personal life
She married Gary Winton, a furniture salesman, in 1954, and converted to her husband's Jewish faith; they were divorced in 1965, and he died in 1968. She was the mother of television presenter Dale Winton. She died by suicide in 1976 by taking a barbiturate overdose after a lifelong battle with clinical depression. She was found by her son Dale, and a "do not disturb" sign was outside her bedroom door.

Selected filmography
 First Man into Space (1959) as nurse at blood bank
 The Devil's Disciple (1959, uncredited)
 Follow a Star (1959, uncredited)
 Dentist in the Chair (1960) as Jayne
 Spike Milligan: A Series of Unrelated Incidents at Current Market Value (1961, TV film)
 It's a Square World (played various characters in 3 episodes, 1961–63)
 The Road to Hong Kong (1962, uncredited)
 Terry-Thomas (1963, TV film)
 The Big Eat (1965, TV film)
 Thunderball (1965, uncredited)
 The Assassination Bureau (1969, uncredited)
 Rhubarb (1969) as Lady Pupil Rhubarb

Television appearances
 Citizen James (1961)
 Man of the World – episode "Blaze of Glory" (1962) as Strait's friend
 Out of This World – episode "The Tycoons" (1962) as a girl
 The Sentimental Agent – episode "A Box Of Tricks" (1963) as fellow traveller
 Espionage – episode "The Incurable One" (1963) as stripper
 HMS Paradise – episode 12 (1964) as Fiona, 3rd Wren
 Frankie Howerd (1964–1966) – played Yvonne in two episodes in 1966

References

External links

 
 

1935 births
1976 deaths
People from Hampstead
English television actresses
English film actresses
English Jews
Converts to Judaism
Drug-related suicides in England
Barbiturates-related deaths
20th-century English actresses
Actresses from London
1976 suicides